

Princess of Transylvania

Grand Princess of Transylvania

See also
Prince of Transylvania
List of Hungarian consorts
List of Polish consorts
List of Austrian consorts
List of Romanian consorts
List of consorts of Wallachia
List of consorts of Moldavia

Sources

 
Transylvania
 
Transylvanian consorts
Transylvanian consorts
Transylvania